Caffeoylquinic acids (CQA) are compounds composed of a quinic acid core, acylated with one or more caffeoyl groups. There is a positive correlation between the number of caffeoyl groups bound to quinic acid and the rate of ATP production. Compounds of this class include:
 Chlorogenic acid (3-O-caffeoylquinic acid or 3-CQA)
 4-O-caffeoylquinic acid (crypto-chlorogenic acid or 4-CQA)
 5-O-caffeoylquinic acid (neo-chlorogenic acid or 5-CQA)
 1,5-diCQA
 3,4-diCQA
 3,5-diCQA
 4,5-diCQA

References